Robert Conway may refer to:

Robert Conway (admiral), United States military officer
Robert Conway (director) (born 1979), American director
Robert Seymour Conway (1864–1933), British classical scholar and comparative philologist
Robert Conway, hero of Lost Horizon
Rob Conway (born 1974), American professional wrestler